The 2011 Indian Premier League season, abbreviated as IPL 4 or the IPL 2011, was the fourth season of the Indian Premier League, the top Twenty20 cricket league in India. The tournament was hosted in India and the opening and closing ceremonies were held in M. A. Chidambaram Stadium, Chennai, the home venue of the reigning champions Chennai Super Kings. The season ran from 8 April to 28 May 2011. This season the number of teams in the league went from eight to ten with the additions of the Pune Warriors India and the Kochi Tuskers Kerala. The tagline was Dum laga ke mara re ! (hit with power !)

The tournament was won by the Chennai Super Kings for the second successive season defeating Royal Challengers Bangalore by 58 runs in the final in Chennai, with the winning team's Murali Vijay being named Man of the Match. With this win CSK became the first, and till 2014 the only team to have won the IPL on more than one occasion. Despite Bangalore failing to win the title, one of the team's players, Chris Gayle was named as the tournament's best player. He scored 608 runs in twelve innings – the most in the tournament – as well as picking up eight wickets, having joined the team after the start of the season due to an injury to another overseas player, Dirk Nannes. Mumbai Indians' Lasith Malinga set a new record for most wickets taken within an Indian Premier League season, claiming 28 wickets during the campaign, but Mumbai had to settle for third place in the tournament, having lost to Bangalore in the second qualifier. Chennai, Bangalore and Mumbai represented India in the Champions League 2011 tournament in September. The Fair Play Award was again won by the Chennai Super Kings for topping the fair-play table.

Format
With the introduction of 2 new teams, a new ten-team format was created. This new format consists of 74 matches and was introduced as retaining the previous format would result in 94 matches, significantly greater than the 60 matches from the previous season, where teams compete in a double round-robin tournament. The knockout stage was changed to a playoff format. If a match ends in a tie, a Super Over will be played to determine the winner.

The ten teams are divided into two groups of five. In the group stage, each team plays 14 games: facing the other four teams in their group two times each (one home and one away game), four teams in the other group once, and the remaining team two times. A random draw was used to determine the groups and who plays whom across the groups once and twice.

Each team plays the team in the same row and the same column twice, and all others once. For instance, Deccan chargers will play Chennai Super Kings and the other Group A teams twice but the other teams from Group B (Kolkata Knight Riders, Kochi Tuskers Kerala, Royal Challengers Bangalore and Rajasthan Royals) only once. Similarly Kochi Tuskers Kerala will play Delhi Daredevils and the other Group B teams twice but all other teams from Group A only once.

Team winning a match will be awarded 2 points. The losing team will not receive any points. In case of a draw or no result, both teams will be awarded 1 point.

A four-game playoff stage following the Page playoff system is held after the group stage. Four games will be played in the playoffs:
 Qualifier 1: between the teams ranked first and second in the group stage.
 Eliminator: between the teams ranked third and fourth in the group stage.
 Qualifier 2: between the loser of the Qualifier 1 and winner of the Eliminator.
 Final: between the winners of the Qualifiers 1 and 2.

The top three teams from the tournament qualify for the 2011 Champions League Twenty20 while the fourth team enters the qualifying stage of the tournament. Due to the playoff format, the qualifying teams will be the top two teams of the group stage and the winner of the Eliminator in the playoff stage.

Venues

Squads

Each team can have a squad of at most 30 players with a maximum of US$9 million to spend on purchasing players. . Choosing to retain players would subject to a reduction in their salary cap, reducing the amount they may spend on other players. All other players were added to the auction held on 8 and 9 January 2011.

The catchment areas of the eight existing teams were changed to account for the two new teams. Catchment areas are nominated areas to help each side select their local players. Each team must select four players from their area.

A total of 12 players have been retained by all the franchises while the remaining go to the auction list. The retained players – who must have been part of the franchise's registered squads for the 2010 season – were valued at $1.8 million for the first player, $1.3 million for the second, $900,000 for the third and $500,000 for the fourth. Mumbai Indians and Chennai Super Kings retained the maximum of four players while the Kings XI Punjab, Deccan Chargers and Kolkata Knight Riders released all their players.
The RCB franchise owners only retained one player (Virat Kohli), but let go few key players – Rahul Dravid, Dale Steyn, Jacques Kallis. These players emerged very consistent subsequently in the years 2012, 2013.

Teams and standings

Points table

This table is correct.

("C" refers to the "Champions" of the Tournament. 'R'(2nd Position), '3' and '4' are the positions of the respective teams in the tournament.)

Pune and Kochi are new to the league. The auction for these teams was held at Chennai on 22 March 2010. These two bids, worth a total of Rs 3,235 crore, were more than the Rs 2,853 crore collectively paid for the eight franchises in the first auction, on 24 January 2008.

The Rajasthan Royals, and the Kings XI Punjab were temporarily ejected from the league due to issues with their unreported ownership changes. The teams were reinstated with involvement from the High Court. Their owners were broken into several legal entities when the BCCI required the incorporation of the companies. Kochi was also at risk of ejection for the same reasons before BCCI cleared their new ownership pattern for the tournament.

Results

Group stage

Playoff stage

Fixtures
All match times in Indian Standard Time (UTC+5:30)

Group stage

Playoff stage
Qualifier 1

Eliminator

Qualifier 2

Final

Statistics

Most runs

 The leading scorer of the league phase wore an orange cap when fielding.

Most wickets

 The tournament's leading wicket taker wore a purple cap when fielding.

References

External links
 Official Indian Premier League website
 CricInfo Indian Premier League 2011 minisite

 
Indian Premier League seasons
1
Indian Premier League